Lakewood Heights is a primarily Black (and historically also a Jewish working-class) neighborhood in southeast Atlanta. It is bounded by:
 the Betmar LaVilla, the Villages at Carver, and South Atlanta neighborhoods on the north,
 the Chosewood Park neighborhood on the northeast,
 the Norwood Manor neighborhood on the southeast,
 the Polar Rock, Swallow Circle/Baywood and Lakewood neighborhoods on the south
 the Downtown Connector on the west, across which lie the Sylvan Hills and Capitol View Homes neighborhoods

Lakewood Heights contains the Lakewood Heights Historic District, listed on the National Register of Historic Places.

History

Factors leading to development
Lakewood Heights developed as the result of three separate factors:
 The streetcar line along Jonesboro Road, which enabled commercial and residential development along the corridor
 Parallel to that, development of an industrial area including the General Motors Lakewood Assembly plant
 Development of a black neighborhood around the Gammon Theological Seminary and Clark University, now the site of The New Schools at Carver high school
 Development of the Southeast Regional Fairgrounds on the site of the city's first waterworks plant along Lakewood Avenue—streetcar access from Downtown Atlanta enabled subsequent development of public and private housing projects along Pryor Road, then a major artery to and from downtown

Private enterprise and model homes
One section of Lakewood Heights is Oak Knoll, which was noted in a 1937 meeting between Techwood Homes organizer Charles Forrest Palmer, President Franklin Delano Roosevelt, first lady Eleanor Roosevelt and Secretary of the Treasury Henry Morgenthau, Jr. Roosevelt was delighted that private enterprise—backed by guarantees the Federal Housing Administration—could provide good homes at moderate rentals. The conversation about Oak Knoll drew the conclusion that private projects were in fact strengthened by public housing projects serving as a "pace setter", and helped support arguments for a more proactive nationwide public housing policy. The house at 1099 Oak Knoll Drive was featured in a 1938 issue of Life magazine, as it was a Life  "model house"; the model kits were available for purchase from retailers around the country.

Assembly plant to media productions
The neighborhood was home to the Lakewood Fairgrounds which until 1979 had a racetrack, Lakewood Speedway. Now the Lakewood (a.k.a. Aaron's, a.k.a. Hi-Fi Buys) Amphitheater is located on the old fairgrounds.

Around 1970 the area began to decline as middle-class families moved away. The assembly plant finally closed in 1990.

The area is now an important center of the growing Atlanta-area film and television production industry. The EUE/Screen Gems Atlanta soundstages were established there in mid-2010 and by Autumn 2011 were already expanding.

Parks
 South Bend Park (76.6 acres)
 John C. Burdine Center (4.27 acres)

Gallery

See also

Lakewood Fairgrounds
Lakewood Assembly (GM plant)

References

External links
 Lakewood Heights Civic Association
 Sustainable Lakewood: History of Lakewood Heights
 Friends of South Bend Park

African-American history in Atlanta
Historic Jewish communities in the United States
Jews and Judaism in Atlanta
National Register of Historic Places in Atlanta
Neighborhoods in Atlanta
Streetcar suburbs
Historic districts on the National Register of Historic Places in Georgia (U.S. state)
Working-class culture in the United States